is a Japanese journalist, TV presenter, and writer. She is also president of the Japan Institute for National Fundamentals, established in 2007.

Life 
Sakurai was born to Japanese parents in Vietnam. After returning with her family to Japan, she graduated from Nagaoka High School. Later she graduated from the University of Hawaii at Manoa, majoring in history.

Sakurai started her career as a journalist for the Christian Science Monitor in Tokyo. She served as a news presenter on Nippon Television's late night news programme Kyo-no-dekigoto from 1980 to 1996. She worked on the HIV-tainted blood scandal in Japan during the 1990s.
 
Affiliated with the openly revisionist lobby Nippon Kaigi, Sakurai denies sexual slavery by the Japanese imperial military during World War II (i.e. "comfort women"). She promoted Taniyama Yūjirō's 2015 Scottsboro Girls film in Japan and the United States, a revisionist film aimed at denying the sexual enslavement of comfort women.

In 2007, she supported a film about the Nanjing Massacre, The Truth about Nanjing. Satoru Mizushima, the director and producer of the film, has said the massacre is nothing more than propaganda.

She is the originator of the term "Tokutei Asia".

References

External links 

 (in Japanese)
 
 On a radio talk show with Shinzō Abe, April 2004

1945 births
Conservatism in Japan
Japanese women journalists
Japanese nationalists
Japanese television personalities
Keio University alumni
Living people
Battle of Okinawa
University of Hawaiʻi alumni
Members of Nippon Kaigi
Japanese broadcast news analysts
Japanese expatriates in Vietnam
Women television journalists